Dalcerides alba is a moth in the family Dalceridae. It was described by Herbert Druce in 1887. It is found in southern Mexico, Guatemala, Honduras, Belize, Costa Rica, Panama, Colombia and Ecuador.

The larvae feed on Colubrina species.

References

Moths described in 1887
Dalceridae